The grey-bellied wren-babbler (Spelaeornis reptatus) is a bird species in the family Timaliidae. It was until recently considered a subspecies of the long-tailed wren-babbler; the IUCN, for example, started recognizing it as distinct species in 2008.

It is found in China (Yunnan), India (Arunachal Pradesh), Myanmar, and Thailand. Its natural habitat is subtropical moist montane forest. It is classified as a Species of Least Concern by the IUCN.

Footnotes

References
 BirdLife International (BLI) (2008): [2008 IUCN Redlist status changes]. Retrieved 2008-MAY-23.

grey-bellied wren-babbler
Birds of India
Birds of Myanmar
Birds of Thailand
Birds of Yunnan
grey-bellied wren-babbler